Shivam Gupta is an Indian casting director. He is associated with Hindi Film Industry. He is best known for casting Music Teacher, Yeh Kaali Kaali Aankhein, Sacred Games and Chacha Vidhayak Hain Humare.

Early life 
Gupta was born in Gonda, Uttar Pradesh.

Career 
Gupta started as an associate casting director with the films and webseries like Raid, Batti Gul Meter Chalu, Mirzapur and Qarib Qarib Single.
In year 2019, he made his debut as main casting director with the film Music Teacher. He worked for the movies and web series like Kanpuriye, Yeh Kaali Kaali Aankhein, Sacred Games, Zindgi inshort, Little Things, Choked and Chalo Koi Baat Nahi.

Filmography

As a casting director 

 Music Teacher
 Choked
 Little things season 3
 Kanpuriye
 Yeh Kaali Kaali Aankhein
 Sacred Games
 Zindgi inshort
 Choked
 Chalo Koi Baat Nahi
 Chacha Vidhayak Hain Humare
 Daddy
 Barah by Barah

As an associate casting director 

 Raid
 Batti Gul Meter Chalu
 Mirzapur
 Qarib Qarib Single

References

External links 

 

Living people
Indian casting directors
Year of birth missing (living people)